A&W may refer to:
 A&W Restaurants, an American fast food chain
 A&W (Canada), a fast food chain originally a part of A&W Restaurants, later sold and operated as a separate company
 Ahnapee and Western Railway
 Alexandria & Western Railway
 "A&W" (song), a song by American singer Lana Del Rey